Kilmeri, or bo apulyo is a Papuan language of Papua New Guinea near the border with Indonesian Papua. It is not being learned by children.

Kilmeri is spoken around Ossima ward in Bewani/Wutung Onei Rural LLG, Sandaun Province.

Speakers of Kilmeri refer to their own language as bo apulyo, meaning sound in the middle.

Dialects
Dialects are:

 Western Kilmeri dialect (spoken in western villages)
Elau
 Osol
Kilipau
Kiliwes
Isi
I
Isi II
Sosi
Ilup
Eastern Kilmeri dialect (spoken in eastern villages and hamlets)
Ossima
 Isi Daru
Akos
Awol
Airu
Asue
Omoi
Omula
The two major dialect groupings have an estimated cognate percentage of 82% based on lexicostatistics.

Phonology
Kilmeri distinguishes 18 consonants, 12 of which are phonemic. 

The sounds in parenthesis are possible allophones of the bilabial trill. [β] can be intervocalical, [ɸ] can be the final sound, and [pʷ̜] can be syllable-initial. The sounds in half brackets occur extremely rarely and can likely be attributed to loan words.  

The exceedingly rare bilabial trill /ʙ/ is found in the areal-related Kwomtari and Sko languages, but not in other Border languages. It likely developed from a prenasalized bilabial stop followed by a high back rounded vowel, hence why [mbu] occurs only in ten words. 

Kilmeri has eight vowels, all of which are always short. 

The near-high and near-low vowels are especially rare. Thus, Kilmeri was believed to have seven vowels until a small selection of words, such as /bi/ (pig) and /bI/ (hole) show a clear distinction between /i/ and /I/.

The main syllable structure is CV with two preferred syllables.

Orthography 
The phonetic inventory easily translates into Latin letters. The near-low vowel uses ae and the near-high vowels use diacritics. Literate Kilmeri speakers much preferred the symbol p for the bilabial trill, but pp was selected to indicate two different phonemes.

Pronouns
Kilmeri has eleven personal pronouns without gender distinction. 

The dual forms end with the locative suffix -yo and is derived from the singular. The inclusive dual is often substituted with the inclusive plural, especially in narrative stories.

Verbs
Kilmeri verb forms can express complex modality. Examples:

{|
| de-le || -go || ‘will probably go’
|-
| lam < le-m || go- || ‘might go’
|-
| lou < le-ou || go- || ‘go in vain’
|-
| lap < le-p || go- || ‘go!’
|-
| klam < k-le-m || -go- || ‘don’t go!’
|-
| loipap < le-ipe-p || go-first- || ‘go first, and then…’
|}

Circumfixes can also be applied to verbs in Kilmeri.

Number agreement in Kilmeri is absolutive rather than accusative.

In Kilmeri, intransitive verbs, as well as the two transitive verbs ‘eat’ and ‘throw down to’, agree with subjects in number. This pattern is also present in Amanab. These verbs are:

{| 
! gloss !! singular !! plural
|-
| ‘eat’ || ni || ile
|-
| ‘throw down to’ || pakʊne || pakʊpi
|-
| ‘come’ || pule || pulupi
|-
| ‘die’ || sui || supuli
|-
| ‘go’ || le || mole
|-
| ‘sit’ || nake || mape
|-
| ‘sleep’ || nui || sapi
|-
| ‘speak’ || mui || molive
|}

However, number marking for transitive verbs, except for ‘eat’ and ‘throw down to’, refers to the number of the object, rather than the subject.

{| 
! gloss !! singular !! plural
|-
| ‘carry’ || wili || moli
|-
| ‘carry hanging’ || lali || laluli
|-
| ‘cook’ || si || sepi
|-
| ‘cut’ || suke || sukeli
|-
| ‘dig’ || rari || rararpi
|-
| ‘erect’ || newe || newaupi
|-
| ‘fetch someone’ || lakive || leki
|-
| ‘fill’ || norive || nororpi
|-
| ‘harvest’ || lapiye || lapapi
|-
| ‘mark’ || lopi || lopapi
|-
| ‘sharpen’ || merive || mererpi
|-
| ‘take out’ || pulive || puloli
|-
| ‘tear’ || pike || pikeki
|}

References

Border languages (New Guinea)
Languages of Sandaun Province